Northeast Park is a neighborhood in the Northeast community in Minneapolis, Minnesota. Its boundaries are 18th Avenue NE and New Brighton Boulevard to the north, the city limits to the northeast, Interstate 35W to the southeast, Broadway Street NE to the south, and Central Avenue to the west. The Quarry shopping center is located in this neighborhood. Northeast Athletic Field Park resides in the neighborhood with various baseball fields, soccer fields and playgrounds. In 2018, A new Recreation center was built in the Northeast Athletic Field Park.

References

External links
Minneapolis Neighborhood Profile - Northeast Park

Neighborhoods in Minneapolis